Cawston is the name of various places:

In Canada:

Cawston, British Columbia

In England:

Cawston, Norfolk
Cawston, Warwickshire
Cawston, Nottinghamshire